Lebrón is a surname originating in Spain, where it is most prevalent in the Autonomous Community of Andalucía. It is an augmentative of liebre (meaning "hare" in Spanish). Lebrón is sometimes transliterated into an English given name as Lebron or LeBron, although these forms can also be derived from the French surnames Lebrun or Le Brun, meaning "the brown". People with the name include:

As a surname
Antonio de Padua María Severino López de Santa Anna y Pérez de Lebrón (1794–1876) a.k.a. "Santa Anna", Mexican political leader, general and president
Benjamín Cintrón Lebrón, Puerto Rican politician
Betty LeBron, lead singer of the freestyle group Sweet Sensation
Juan Manuel Lebrón (born 1947), Puerto Rican actor, model, scriptwriter, television producer
Lolita Lebrón (1919–2010), Puerto Rican activist and revolutionary 
Luisa Lebrón (born 1949), Puerto Rican judge and politician
Mariano Lebrón Saviñón (born 1922), Dominican writer
Mariasela Álvarez Lebrón, Miss World 1982 and Miss Dominican Republic 1982
Maybell Lebron (born 1923), Argentine-Paraguayan writer
Michael A. Lebron, petitioner in the Supreme Court case Lebron v. National Railroad Passenger Corp.
Michael William Lebron a.k.a. "Lionel" (born 1958), American radio and television personality
Mike Lebrón a.k.a. "Spanish Mike" (born 1934), Puerto Rican pool player
Sergio Calatayud Lebrón (born 1990), Spanish footballer
LeBrón Brothers, Puerto Rican musicians

As a given name
LeBron James (born 1984), American basketball player
The LeBrons, a mock family based on the basketball player
LeBron "Bronny" James (born 2004), American basketball player
Lebron Shields (born 1937), American football player

See also
Leebron, surname
Lebrun, given name and surname
Le Baron (disambiguation), includes list of people with name Le Baron

References

Spanish-language surnames